The flag of the Nieuwe Republiek was the official flag of this short-lived South African state from 1884 to 1888.

History
The Nieuwe Republiek ('New Republic') was established in north-western Zululand by a few hundred Boer farmers in August 1884 after they signed a treaty with the Zulu king. By agreement with the neighbouring South African Republic, it was incorporated into the ZAR in July 1888.  

The Volksraad (legislature) approved an official flag on 13 November 1884.

Description

The flag was evidently inspired by the 'Vierkleur' Flag of the South African Republic.  The colours were simply re-arranged, so that the horizontal bands were  red, white and green, and the vertical bar was blue. The Volksraad resolution specified that a small Union Jack should be placed on the blue, a small ZAR 'Vierkleur' on the red, a small  Orange Free State flag on the white, and a small  Cape Colony flag on the green.  However, this was not done.

References

Sources
 Burgers, A.P. (1997).  Sovereign Flags over Southern Africa.
 Burgers, A.P. (2008).  The South African Flag Book.
 Van Zyl, J.A. (1995).  'History of the Flags of South Africa before 1900' in SAVA Journal SJ 4/95.

See also
 List of South African flags
 Flag of the Cape Colony
 Flag of Goshen
 Flag of Natal
 Flag of the Natalia Republic
 Flag of the Orange Free State
 Flag of the Orange River Colony
 Flag of South Africa
 Flag of the South African Republic
 Flag of Stellaland
 Flag of Transvaal

1884 introductions 
Flags of South Africa
South African heraldry
Historical flags